{{DISPLAYTITLE:C43H52N4O5}}
The molecular formula C43H52N4O5 (molar mass: 704.912 g/mol, exact mass: 704.3938 u) may refer to:

 Conodurine
 Voacamine

Molecular formulas